Derek Deadman (11 March 1940 – 22 November 2014) was an English character actor who appeared in numerous British films and television series for 38 years.

Family
Born in Fulham, Derek Deadman was one of the three sons of George and Edith Deadman. Derek had a son, Jake and two grandsons, Luke and Ari.

Television
Deadman appeared on television in minor roles before being cast in a more significant part as Rankin in two episodes of the RAF sitcom Get Some In! in 1975 and 1978. He then played Ringo in 39 of the 66 episodes of the series Never the Twain between 1981 and 1991. He also played the ruthless Sontaran Commander Stor in the Doctor Who serial The Invasion of Time.

Film
His many film appearances include roles in The Canterbury Tales (1972), Queen Kong (1976), Jabberwocky (1977), The Glitterball (1977), The Big Sleep (1978), the film version of Porridge (1979), A Nightingale Sang in Berkeley Square (1979), The Apple (1980), Time Bandits (1981), Never Say Never Again (1983), Bullshot (1983), Brazil (1985), National Lampoon's European Vacation (1985), Robin Hood: Prince of Thieves  (1991), and the barman of The Leaky Cauldron, Tom, in Harry Potter and the Philosopher's Stone (2001).

Death
Deadman died of complications from diabetes in Frespech, France, where he moved to upon his retirement, in 2014, aged 74.

Filmography

References

External links

English male television actors
1940 births
2014 deaths
English male film actors
People from Margate
Male actors from Kent
20th-century English male actors
21st-century English male actors
Deaths from diabetes